William R. M. Perraudin is a British economist.  He is an adjunct professor and former Chair of Finance at Imperial College London, specialising in the fields of risk and pricing of debt instruments. He is a director of the risk management software and consultancy firm Risk Control Limited.

As an expert in the field of risk as applied to financial regulation, Perraudin has been a special advisor to the Bank of England. He has long taken the position that the financial models in use by major institutions are insufficiently conservative.

Education
From 1977 to 1981, William Perraudin studied French and History at the University of Oxford. From 1981 to 1983, he studied for a MSc in economics at London School of Economics, before gaining a PhD in economics from Harvard University. He earned an M.S. in applied mathematics, 1987 to 1988, also from Harvard.

Career
Before moving to Imperial, Professor Perraudin headed the finance group of Birkbeck College, University of London. He also taught at Cambridge University

He is an associate editor of Quantitative Finance, the Journal of Banking and Finance and the Journal of Credit Risk.

Selected publications

References

External links

BBC interview
Academic homepage at Imperial

British economists
Alumni of the University of Oxford
Academics of Imperial College London
Year of birth missing (living people)
Living people
Harvard School of Engineering and Applied Sciences alumni